East Norfolk Sixth Form College (commonly abbreviated to  EN) is a sixth form college in the Gorleston-on-Sea area of Great Yarmouth, Norfolk, England.

Opened in 1982 it uses the building of the former Alderman Leach Secondary Modern school to form part of its campus in the centre of Gorleston-on-Sea. The college offers 80 different subjects including A levels, BTEC, GCSE and a number of other pathways in further education. New pathways include T Levels and the Level 4 Foundation Degree programmes and the Elite Football Programme in conjunction with Norwich City CSF. The College is also one of only 25 FA Super Hubs and the only local provider with a Combined Cadet Force (CCF). It is also an approved centre for the Duke of Edinburgh Awards. 

The college has about 1,600 students most of whom are aged 16–18 and enrol from a wide catchment area across Norfolk and North Suffolk. In recent years the college has undergone expansion and refurbishment in a number of areas and in 2021 is investing a further £3 million into the campus. This includes a state of the art 3G pitch, and investment in new classrooms and technology to support the delivery of the T Level programme.

References

Sixth form colleges in Norfolk
Gorleston-on-Sea
Educational institutions established in 1982
1982 establishments in England